Divide and Exit is the seventh studio album by British post-punk duo Sleaford Mods. It was released on 19 May 2014 through Harbinger Sound.

Reception

At Metacritic, which assigns a normalized rating out of 100 to reviews from mainstream critics, Divide and Exit received an average score of 81 based on eleven reviews, indicating "universal acclaim". The album received positive reviews from Pitchfork and The Guardian, who named it one of the 10 best albums of 2014.

Track listing

References

External links 
 

2014 albums
Sleaford Mods albums